Ioan Daniel Petroiesc (born 13 October 1975), commonly known as Daniel Petroiesc, is a Romanian professional footballer who plays as a defender or midfielder for Liga V club AS Strejnic. Petroiesc started his career at Corvinul Hunedoara, the club from his hometown, a club known in the past for its productive football academy. In 1997 Petroiesc moved to Astra Ploiești, club for which he played the most of his career, with 14 goals in 185 matches for Astra, Petroiesc entered in the "Black Devils" hall of fame. Afterwards he played for Astra's main rival Petrolul Ploiești and also for teams such as: Argeș Pitești, Brașov or Conpet Ploiești. In December 2017 Petroiesc decided to return on the pitch at 42 years old and at 9 years after his retirement, signing with AS Strejnic, from Prahova County.

Honours

 Astra Ploiești
 Liga II: 1997–98

References

External links
 

1975 births
Living people
Sportspeople from Hunedoara
Romanian footballers
Association football defenders
Association football midfielders
Liga I players
Liga II players
CS Corvinul Hunedoara players
FC Astra Giurgiu players
FC Petrolul Ploiești players
FC Argeș Pitești players
FC Brașov (1936) players